There are about 1,000 listed buildings in Sheffield. Of these only five are Grade I listed, and 42 are Grade II*, the rest being Grade II listed. The buildings vary from a listed facade to the largest listed building in Europe (Park Hill).

The dates given refer to the year(s) of completion.

Grade I

Grade II*
This is a complete list of all Grade II* listed buildings in Sheffield.

Grade II

See also 
Grade I listed buildings in South Yorkshire
Listed buildings in Sheffield City Centre

References 

 - A list of all the listed buildings within Sheffield City Council's boundary is available to download from this page.
Images of England

 
Sheffield